"I've Been Loving You" is the 1968 debut single by English musician Elton John with lyrics credited to Bernie Taupin (although John later admitted that he wrote the song by himself, giving Taupin credit as an effort to earn Taupin his first publishing royalties). The B-side is "Here's to the Next Time", an Elton John composition. "I've Been Loving You" was not originally included on any album and the single was withdrawn shortly after its release.  Neither side appeared on any official album release until the 1992 Rare Masters box set (which featured previously unreleased stereo mixes of both).

The single is extremely rare. An even rarer 4-song EP, released only in Portugal, contained two additional songs: "Thank You for All Your Loving" (written by John and then bandmate Caleb Quaye) and "Angel Tree" (the first true release of a John/Taupin composition).

According to John's YouTube channel, the single's B-side, "Here's to the Next Time", was recorded at DJM studios in late 1967.

Wednesday cover version
In 1976, Canadian band Wednesday covered the song under the title "Loving You Baby".  It was a substantial hit in their native country, peaking at No. 6 for two weeks on the Canadian singles chart. It is ranked as the 78th biggest Canadian hit of 1976.

Chart history

Weekly charts

Year-end charts

Other cover versions
 On 24 May 1968 (shortly after John's release), Edwin Bee released it as a single, marking the first cover version of an Elton John composition.

 Jack Bedient & the Chessmen, a popular party band based in and around California, Nevada, and the Pacific northwest in the 1960s, released a version of the song in 1969. Bedient & the Chessmen recorded and released numerous singles and albums during that time, and disbanded in the early '70s.

References

External links
 
 

1968 songs
1968 debut singles
1968 debut EPs
1976 singles
Elton John songs
Songs with lyrics by Bernie Taupin
Songs with music by Elton John
Philips Records singles
Wednesday (band) songs